The Canadian Ski Hall of Fame was created by the Canadian Ski Museum in 1982 to honour skiing pioneers, competitors, coaches, officials, and builders.

List of inductees
 Denotes deceased

A
Dennis Adkin, 1983*
Pierre Alain, 1984
Verne Anderson, 1990*
Peter Andrews, 1994
Marie-Claude Asselin, 1991
Greg Athans, 2008*

B
William L. Ball, 1982*
Lucie Barma, 2004
Bob Bartley, 1983
Myriam Bedard, 2001
Felix Belczyk, 1998
André Bertrand, 1989
Alexandre Bilodeau, 2020
Réal Boulanger, 2019
Rob Boyd, 2000
Jean-Luc Brassard, 2008
Todd Brooker, 1991
Jean-Guy Brunet, 1999
Horst Bulau, 1994

C
Gordon Canning, 2020
Bruce Carnall, 1985*
Owen Carney, 2004
Ed Champagne, 1995
Currie Chapman, 1993
Real Charette, 1993*
Jacques Charland, 1990
Philip Chew, 2020
W.G. Clark, 1982*
H.T. "Sam" Cliff, 1982*
John Clifford, 1982*
Elisabeth Betsy Clifford 1982
Harvey Clifford, 1988*
Remi Cloutier, 1997
Emile Cochand, 1983*
Louis Cochand, 1986
Steve Collins, 1995
Chandra Crawford, 2019
Judy Crawford-Rawley, 1995
Linda Crutchfield, 1984

D
Sidney Dawes, 1982*
Michel Dehouck, 1982*
W.F.C. Devlin, 1982*
H.Percy Douglas, 1982*
Peter Duncan, 1986

E
John Eaves, 1988

F
Dr. Douglas Firth, 1983*
Sharon Firth, 1990
Shirley Firth, 1990
Joseph Fitzgerald, 2020
Nicolas Fontaine, 2007
Anna Fraser (-Sproule,) 1996
John Fripp, 1988
Shaun Fripp, 2009
John Fry, 2018*

G
Hermann Gadner, 1993*
Meredith Gardner, 1995
Max Gartner, 2007
Gault Gillespie, 1987*
Bob Gilmour 2003
Hans Gmoser 1989*
Robert W. Gooch, 1984*
Russell Goodman, 2018
Laurie Graham, 1991
Thomas Grandi, 2018
Nancy Greene (-Raine,) 1992
Louis Grimes, 1986*
H. Rae Grinnell, 1987

H
Fred Hall, 1983*
Martin Hall, 2018
Pierre Harvey, 1992
Ellis Hazen, 1982*
Anne Heggtveit (-Hamilton,) 1982
Jennifer Heil, 2019
Scott Henderson, 1989
Jim Hunter, 1987
Malcolm Hunter, 2019

I
Bill Irwin, 2000
Dave Irwin, 1992
Mike Irwin, 2019

J
Dave Jacobs, 1988
Olaus Jeldness, 1988*
Piotr Jelen, 2009
John Johnston, 1995
Jerry Johnston, 1991
Peter Judge, 1996

K
Bill Keenan, 2001
Andrzej Kozbial, 2000*
Laurie Kreiner, 2010
Kathy Kreiner (-Phillips), 1984
John Kucera, 2018

L
Mark Labow, 2010
Raymond Lanctot, 1994*
Roger Langley, 1986*
Lloyd Langlois, 2002
Alain LaRoche, 1999
Philippe LaRoche 1998
Yves LaRoche, 1992
J. Ross Larway, 1984*
Kerrin Lee-Gartner, 1996
Sigurd Lockeberg, 1982*
Sir Arnold Lunn, 1990*
Don Lyon, 1994

M
Darrell MacLachlan, 2020
Norman MacTaggart, 1985*
Karl Martitsch, 1996*	
Jim McConkey, 2001
Ernie F. McCulloch, 1984*
Lorne McFadgen, 2019
Ashleigh McIvor, 2019
Arnold Midgley, 1993
Fred Morris, 1993*
LeeLee Morrison, 1997
C.E. Mortureux, 1982*
Cary Mullen, 2002
Dave Murray, 1990*

N
Heinz Neiderhauser, 2010
Nels Nelsen, 1983*
Keith Nesbitt, 1991

O
Lorne O'Connor, 1992

P
Kate Pace-Lindsay, 2001
A.H. Pangman, 1983*
Christian Percival (née Percival Bott), 1987*
Karen Percy (-Lowe,) 1992
Bjorger Pettersen, 2007
Doug Pfeiffer, 2000
Francois Pichard, 1983
Gaby Pleau, 1984*
Steve Podborski, 1988
Edi Podivinsky, 2007
Fraser Pullen, 2004
Dave Pym, 2008

R
Al Raine, 1988
Patricia Ramage, C.M. 1989*
Dorothy Read, 2001*
Ken Read, 1987
Dave Rees, 2003
Ron Richards, 1999
Bob Richardson, 1997*
Chris Robinson, 2009
Katie Ronson, 1985*
Jean-Marc Rozon, 1997
Joe Ryan, 1982*

S
Pepi Salvenmoser, 1990
Liisa Savijarvi, 1997
Angela Schmidt-Foster, 1996
William B. Schreiber, 2019
Beckie Scott, 2010
Clarence L. Servold, 1984
Irvin Servold, 1985
Chris Simboli, 1993
John Smart, 2003
Herman Smith-Johannsen, 1982*
Hugh Smythe, 2010
Gerry Sorensen (-Lenihan), 1988
Henry Sotvedt, 1983*
Jimmie Spencer, 2010
Brian Stemmle, 2002
Robert Swan, 2018

T
W.B. Thompson, 1982*
William P. Tindale, 1990*
Andrew Tommy, 1990*
Arthur Tommy, 1989*
Melanie Turgeon, 2007

U
Fred Urquhart, 1989*

W
Freda Wales, 1985*
Richard Weber, 1997
Peter W. Webster, 2003
Jozo Weider, 1983*
Harry Wheeler, 1986*
Lucile Wheeler (-Vaughan), 1982
Clifford White, 1983*
Mike Wiegele, 2000
Franz Wilhelmsen, 1996*
Karolina Wisniewska, 2007
Wayne Wong, 2009
Dave Wood, 2020
Lauren Woolstencroft, 2019
Rhoda Wurtele (-Eaves), 1982
Rhona Wurtele (-Gillis), 1982

 Denotes deceased

See also
List of ski areas and resorts in Canada
 List of skiing topics

References

External links
Canadian Ski Hall of Fame

Skiing in Canada
Ski museums and halls of fame
Halls of fame in Canada
Sports museums in Canada
Canadian sports trophies and awards
Awards established in 1982
1982 establishments in Quebec